
This is a timeline of Indonesian history, comprising important legal and territorial changes and political events in Indonesia and its predecessor states. To read about the background to these events, see History of Indonesia. See also the list of presidents of Indonesia.

 Millennia: 1st BCE1st–2nd3rd

Centuries: 4th BCE2nd BCE1st BCESee alsoFurther readingExternal links

4th century BCE

2nd century BCE

1st century BCE 

 Centuries: 4th5th7th8th9th10th11th12th13th14th15th16th17th18th19th20th

4th century CE

5th century CE

7th century

8th century

9th century

10th century

11th century

12th century

13th century

14th century

15th century

16th century

17th century

18th century

19th century

20th century

21st century

See also
 Timeline of Jakarta
 List of years in Indonesia

References 

 Feith, Herbert (2007) The Decline of Constitutional Democracy in Indonesia  Equinox Publishing (Asia) Pte Ltd, 
 
 Heuken SJ, A (2000). Historical Sites of Jakarta. Cipta Loka Caraka, Jakarta
 Miksic, John N. (1997). Java's Ancient "Indianized" Kingdoms.
 Moore, R.I (General Editor)(1999). Philip's Atlas of World History. Chancellor Press. 
 Ricklefs, M.C. (1991). A history of modern Indonesia since c.1200. Stanford: Stanford University Press. 
 Saafroedin Bahar,Ananda B.Kusuma,Nannie Hudawati, eds, (1992) Risalah Sidang Badan Penyelidik Usahah Persiapan Kemerdekaan Indonesian (BPUPKI) Panitia Persiapan Kemerdekaan Indonesia (PPKI) (Minutes of the Meetings of the Agency for Investigating Efforts for the Preparation of Indonesian Independence and the Preparatory Committee for Indonesian Independence), Sekretariat Negara Republik Indonesia, Jakarta
 Sekretariat Negara Republik Indonesia (1975a) 30 Tahun Indonesia Merdeka: Jilid 2 (1950–1964) (30 Years of Indonesian Independence: Volume 2 (1950–1964))
 Sekretariat Negara Republik Indonesia (1975b) 30 Tahun Indonesia Merdeka: Jilid 3 (1965–1973) (30 Years of Indonesian Independence: Volume 3 (1965–1973))
 
 
  (+ Chronology)

Further reading

External links
 

History of Indonesia
Indonesian
Years in Indonesia